The Wheeler Geologic Area is a highly eroded outcropping of layers of volcanic ash, in the La Garita Mountains of Mineral County, in southern Colorado in the western United States about 10 miles east north-east of Creede.  The ash is the result of eruptions from the La Garita Caldera approximately 25 million years ago.

On December 7, 1908, President Theodore Roosevelt designated the area Wheeler National Monument, the first national monument in Colorado. The area's remote location made visitor visits difficult, and on August 3, 1950, President Harry Truman signed an act abolishing the national monument and creating the Wheeler Geologic Area of Rio Grande National Forest. The geologic area is now part of the La Garita Wilderness.  Lying just below the crest of the range at an elevation of 11,960 feet (3645 m), it can  be reached by an 8.4-mile hike on the East Bellows Trail (FS790), or by a difficult 14 mile four-wheel drive road.

The formations are named after Captain George M. Wheeler, who explored and surveyed this area in 1874 for the U.S. Army.

Further reading
"Hiking Colorado", by Caryn and Peter Boddie (1991).

External links
 USDA.gov: official site
 GORP.com: history
   Wheeler Geologic Area at Atlas Obscura   
 Sangres.com: photo and maps

Protected areas of Mineral County, Colorado
Former National Monuments of the United States
Volcanism of Colorado
Oligocene volcanism